Paclisa may refer to:

 Pâclișa, a village administered by Alba Iulia, Alba County, Romania
 Păclișa, a village in Totești Commune, Hunedoara County, Romania
 Pâclișa River, a tributary of the Mureș River in Romania